Knoydart  is a community in the Canadian province of Nova Scotia, located  in the Municipality of the County of Antigonish.  It is named after Knoydart in Scotland.

The community is most notable for the Culloden Memorial Cairn, commemorating three men who fought on the side of Bonnie Prince Charlie at the Battle of Culloden and emigrated to the area in the 1780s.  The Cairn was erected in 1938 and commemorates Angus MacDonald, Hugh MacDonald and John MacPherson – who are buried near the historic monument. The three men fought for the Jacobite cause in the Clan Ranald Regiment. The stone is a replica of the Cairn on the battlefield in Scotland and contains stones from the battlefield.

Each year since 1982, there is a ceremony to commemorate the day of the battle which is attended by over 300 people.

References

 Knoydart on Destination Nova Scotia
 The Culloden Memorial website

Communities in Pictou County
General Service Areas in Nova Scotia